7800° Fahrenheit is the second studio album by American rock band Bon Jovi. It was released on March 27, 1985, through Mercury Records. The album's title is a reference to the supposed melting point of rock, which is equivalent to 4313° Celsius. In the United States, the Fahrenheit scale is in general use, suggesting the album consists of "American hot rock". The album's artwork introduced the classic 1980s Bon Jovi logo that would later be used on Slippery When Wet and New Jersey. 7800° Fahrenheit spent 104 weeks on the Billboard 200 albums chart and was certified platinum by the Recording Industry Association of America (RIAA) on February 19, 1987. The singles "Only Lonely" and "In and Out of Love" both charted on the Billboard Hot 100.

Background
Recorded in six weeks between January and March 1985, at the Warehouse Studios in Philadelphia, Pennsylvania, the album marked the final collaboration between Bon Jovi and producer Lance Quinn. It is the only Bon Jovi album to feature songwriting by four of the band members; "Secret Dreams" is the only Bon Jovi song to date for which drummer Tico Torres receives a writing credit.

While the album has proved a fan favorite, the band was unsatisfied with its sound and essentially disowned it once they had solidified their status as worldwide superstars with Slippery When Wet and New Jersey. It is the least represented album in their set lists over the course of the career: nothing from 7800° Fahrenheit was performed after the New Jersey Syndicate Tour, but a few performances of "Tokyo Road" in Japan during the 1990s, a few performances of "Only Lonely" during The Circle Tour in 2010, and one performance of "Tokyo Road" in Hawaii, also during The Circle Tour.

"I always overlook the second album," noted Jon Bon Jovi in 2007. "Always have, always will. We had no time to make it and we didn't know who we were... We did whatever producer Lance Quinn said. He was a brilliant guitarist and had made records with Talking Heads, so you listened."

"All of us were going through tough times on a personal level," he explained at the time of Slippery When Wets release. "And the strain told on the music we produced. It wasn't a pleasant experience... Lance Quinn wasn't the man for us, and that added to the feeling that we were going about it badly. None of us want to live in that mental state ever again. We've put the record behind us, and moved on."

Track listing

Some editions of the album list "To the Fire" as "(I Don't Wanna Fall) to the Fire"

Personnel
Credits partly sourced from AllMusic.

Bon Jovi
Jon Bon Jovi – lead and backing vocals, additional rhythm guitar, occasional noise guitars
Richie Sambora – electric, acoustic, and 12-string lead and rhythm guitars, backing vocals
Alec John Such – bass, backing vocals
Tico Torres – drums, percussion, backing vocals
David Bryan – keyboards, backing vocals
Additional musicians
Rick Valenti – backing vocals
Phil Hoffer – backing vocals
Carol Brooks – backing vocals
Jeannie Brooks – backing vocals
Randy Cantor – programming, synthesizer
Tom Mandel – synthesizer
Jim Salamone – programming, synthesizer
Production staff
Lance Quinn – producer
Larry Alexander – engineering
Obie O'Brien – engineering
Bill Scheniman – engineering
Greg Calbi – mastering
Chris Callis – photography
John Cianci – assistant
Fernando Cral – mixing assistant
Stanley Jordan – cover art concept
Bill Levy – art direction, artwork
George Marino – digital remastering, remastering
Vigon Seireeni – art direction, artwork, design
David Thoener – mixing

Charts

Weekly charts

Year-end charts

Certifications

References

1985 albums
Bon Jovi albums
Mercury Records albums
Vertigo Records albums